Naukar Vahuti Da is a 2019 Indian-Punjabi language dramedy film directed by Smeep Kang, starring Binnu Dhillon and Kulraj Randhawa. It has Jaswinder Bhalla, Gurpreet Ghuggi, Preet Anand and Upasna Singh in supporting roles, with Dhillon playing double role. The film was theatrically released on 23 August 2019.

Cast
 Binnu Dhillon as Shivinder / Satnam Singh
 Kulraj Randhawa as Neetu
 Jaswinder Bhalla as Professor Bhullar
 Upasana Singh as Simran Sidhu
 Gurpreet Ghuggi as Goldie
 Preet Anand as Palak
 Smeep Kang as Producer
Japji Khaira as Pinky

Production
The film was announced in November 2018 with the cast of Binnu Dhillon, Jaswinder Bhalla, Kulraj Randhawa, Gurpreet Ghuggi, Preet Anand and Upasana Singh.
The director of the film Smeep Kang along with Sanjiv Kumar, Rohit Kumar, Ruchi Trehan and Ashu Munish Sahni bankrolled the film.

Soundtrack 

The soundtrack is composed by Gurmeet Singh and lyrics by Happy Raikoti and 
Kaptaan.

Release
The official trailer of the film was released by T-Series on 3 August 2019. It garnered 5.3 million views since its release on YouTube. The film was theatrically released on 23 August 2019.

References

External links
 

2019 films
Punjabi-language Indian films
2010s Punjabi-language films
Indian romantic comedy films
2019 romantic comedy films